Demange-aux-Eaux is a former commune in the Meuse department in Grand Est in north-eastern France. On 1 January 2019, it was merged into the new commune Demange-Baudignécourt.

See also
Communes of the Meuse department

References

Demangeauxeaux
Populated places disestablished in 2019